Jacquelyn A. Ottman (born 1955) is a New York City-based consultant specializing in sustainability strategy, green marketing, and eco-innovation. She is the author or co-author of four books on green marketing, including The New Rules of Green Marketing: Strategies, Tools, and Inspiration for Sustainable Branding. She has advised Fortune 500 companies, including GE, Johnson & Johnson, and Procter & Gamble, along with the United States Environmental Protection Agency Energy Star Label She blogs at GreenMarketing.com and at WeHateToWaste.com.

Education
Ottman is a graduate of Smith College, a private, independent women's liberal arts college in Northampton, Massachusetts. She has also been awarded an advanced certification from the Creative Education Foundation in facilitating the Osborn-Parnes Creative Problem Solving Process.

Career
Ottman worked for over twelve years in New York advertising agencies before setting up her own company, J. Ottman Consulting, in 1989. Ottman was the founding co-chair of the Sustainable Brands Conference in 2007 and continued to co-chair in 2008 and 2009, giving the keynote address on sustainable branding ideas. The former co-chair of the NYC chapter of O2, the global network of green designers and marketers, for seven years she chaired the jury of the American Marketing Association's Special Edison Awards for Environmental Achievement. She is the founding co-chair of the Sustainable Business Committee of the Columbia Business School Alumni Club of New York  and sits on the Advisory Boards of the Centre for Sustainable Design (UK), and the Center for Small Business and the Environment. In 2012, she founded WeHateToWaste.com, a global platform for sharing stories about reducing waste in consumer lifestyles. She is the founding chair of the Residential Recycling and Reuse Committee of the Manhattan Solid Waste Advisory Board.

Awards
In 2005, Ottman was named one of “25 Environmental Champions of the Year” by Interiors and Sources magazine in 2005, along with Robert F. Kennedy Jr and George F. Pataki, Governor of NY.  In 2004, Ottman was awarded a $50,000 Innovation Grant from US EPA to create the Design:Green Educational Initiative for Eco-Design. Design:Green now continues as a course in the online Certificate in Sustainable Design program of the Minneapolis College of Art and Design.  In 2002, J. Ottman Consulting Inc. won an award for "Advancing an Understanding of Green Marketing and Eco-Innovation as Sources of Competitive Advantage in Modern Business" from the American Society for Competitiveness.  In 2010, Ottman's book The New Rules of Green Marketing was named a Top 40 Sustainability Book of 2010 by the Cambridge University (UK) Program for Sustainability Leadership.

Publications

References

External links 

 
 

1955 births
Living people
American marketing people
American women writers
Sustainability advocates
Smith College alumni
Branding consultants
Marketing women
21st-century American women